Jalan Pantai Aceh (Penang state road P243)  is a major road in Penang, Malaysia.

List of junctions

Roads in Penang